KTAI (91.1FM) is a radio station licensed to Kingsville, Texas, United States. The station serves the Kingsville-Alice-Falfurrias area and is owned by Texas A&M University-Kingsville.

History
KTAI-FM began as a closed circuit radio broadcast at Texas A&M University-Kingsville (then called Texas A&I University) in 1969.  In 1970, the station upgraded into a full broadcast FM radio station on 91.9 MHz; KTAI was moved to 91.1 MHz in January 1975 as the result of a new international treaty with Mexico, being the only station in the United States relocated under its provisions. KTAI is a student-operated radio station that provides a mix of music, news and live sports programming.  KTAI is currently the only radio station in Kingsville, Texas.

As Kingsville's only radio station, KTAI is a student-operated radio station that provides a mix of music, news and live sports programming.  The school also offers a campus television station, TAMUK TV-2, which is aired throughout the campus and via local Educational-access television cable TV channel 2.  Like KTAI, TAMUK TV-2 offers students the opportunity to work in various aspects and roles of broadcast media while earning college credit.  Many students have moved on to work in radio and television throughout Texas.  Both KTAI and TAMUK TV-2 are operated under the auspices of the Radio and Television division of the Art Communications Theater Arts Department.

In Fall 2011, KTAI began streaming online in HD. They also joined RadioFlag, a social media and content discovery platform for radio at the same time. "RadioFlag allows users to discover new stations, new DJ’s and talk audio hosts, and stream their personal favorite stations from their smartphone or computer."

Awards
KTAI won the first ever Spirit of College Radio Day Award presented by College Radio Day in Fall 2011. In Spring 2012, KTAI won yet another "first" of a RadioFlag sponsored competition for college radio stations. On-Air personality Roughneck Rich, along with three others, won in the category for Best Music Show.

References

External links
 KTAI 91.1 FM Online
 Texas A&M University–Kingsville
 

TAI
TAI
Radio stations established in 1970
1970 establishments in Texas
Kingsville, Texas